The discography of Kodaline, a Dublin-based Irish alternative rock quartet. Originally known as 21 Demands, the band made chart history in March 2007, when their debut single "Give Me a Minute" topped the Irish Singles Chart, becoming the first independently released track to achieve the feat. In June 2013 Kodaline released their debut studio album In a Perfect World, peaking at number 1 on the Irish Albums Chart. "High Hopes" was released as the lead single from the album in March 2013, peaking at number one on the Irish Singles Chart. "Love Like This" was released as the second single from the album in May 2013, peaking at number eight on the Irish Singles Chart. Their second studio album Coming Up for Air reached number one on the Irish Albums Chart. Their third studio album Politics of Living reached the number one on the Irish Albums Chart. Their fourth studio album One Day at a Time reached number two on the Irish Albums Chart.

Albums

Studio albums

Live albums

Extended plays

Singles

As lead artists

As featured artists

Other charted songs

Guest appearances

References

Discographies of Irish artists